The 1965–66 Kentucky Wildcats men's basketball team represented the University of Kentucky in NCAA competition in the 1965–66 season. Coached by Adolph Rupp, the team had no player taller than —unusually small even for that era—and became known as "Rupp's Runts". The Wildcats were members of the Southeastern Conference (SEC), and played their home games at Memorial Coliseum, their home until Rupp Arena opened in 1976.

Led on the floor by future Hall of Fame coach Pat Riley and Louie Dampier, the Cats reached the top ranking in all major polls entering the NCAA tournament; their only regular-season loss was at Tennessee. They ultimately lost in the final 72–65 to Texas Western (now UTEP), a team that was inducted in its entirety to the Hall of Fame. The game is mostly remembered for its sociological subtext—the Miners were the first major college team to start five black players in an NCAA Final (having done so for virtually all of the 1965–66 season), while the Wildcats were all-white (until 1969).

NCAA basketball tournament
Mideast
Kentucky 86, Dayton 70
Kentucky 84, Michigan 77
Final Four
Kentucky 83, Duke 79
Texas Western 72, Kentucky 65

Awards and honors

References

Kentucky Wildcats men's basketball seasons
Kentucky Wildcats
NCAA Division I men's basketball tournament Final Four seasons
Kentucky
Kentucky Wildcats
Kentucky Wildcats